Events from the year 1939 in the United Kingdom. This year sees the start of the Second World War, ending the Interwar period.

Incumbents
 Monarch – George VI
 Prime Minister – Neville Chamberlain (Coalition)
 Parliament – 37th

Events

January–June
 2 January – The all-time highest attendance for a British association football league game is set as 118,567 people watch Rangers beat Celtic in an "Old Firm derby" played at Ibrox Park in Glasgow.
 4 February – The Irish Republican Army bombs two London Underground stations, Tottenham Court Road and Leicester Square, injuring seven, two seriously.
 25 February – The first Anderson shelter is built in London.
 27 February – Borley Rectory, a reputed haunted house in Essex, is destroyed by fire.
 31 March – Britain pledges support to Poland in the event of an invasion.
 4 April – The Royal Armoured Corps is formed.
 11 April – The Women's Royal Naval Service is re-established.
 27 April – The Military Training Act (coming into force 3 June) introduces conscription; men aged 20 and 21 must undertake six months military training.
 May–September –The Sutton Hoo treasure – an Anglo-Saxon ship burial – is excavated.  On 28 July the Sutton Hoo helmet is uncovered. The principal treasures are presented to the British Museum by the landowner, Edith Pretty, at this time its largest ever gift from a living donor.
 6 May – Dorothy Garrod is elected to the Disney Professorship of Archaeology in the University of Cambridge, the first woman to hold an Oxbridge chair.
 15 May – The film Goodbye, Mr. Chips is released, for which actor Robert Donat will win the Academy Award for Best Actor.
 17 May – George VI and Queen Elizabeth arrive in Quebec City to begin the first-ever visit to Canada by a reigning British sovereign.
 1 June – The submarine HMS Thetis sinks during trials in Liverpool Bay. 99 men are lost.
 7 June – George VI and Queen Elizabeth visit New York City on the first visit to the United States by a reigning British sovereign.
 14 June–20 August – Tientsin Incident: the Imperial Japanese Army blockades British trading settlements in the north China treaty port of Tientsin.
 28 June – The Women's Auxiliary Air Force is created, absorbing the forty-eight RAF companies of the Auxiliary Territorial Service which have been formed since 1938.
 30 June – The Mersey Ferry stops running to Rock Ferry.

July–September
 1 July – Women's Land Army re-formed to work in agriculture.
 8 July – the Pan American Airways Boeing 314 flying boat Yankee Clipper inaugurates the world's first heavier-than-air North Atlantic air passenger service between the United States and Britain (Southampton).
 22 July – royal visit to Britannia Royal Naval College, Dartmouth, during which the young Princess Elizabeth first meets her future husband Prince Philip of Greece.
 26 July – the Barber Institute of Fine Arts at the University of Birmingham, designed by Robert Atkinson, is officially opened by Queen Mary.
 5 August – weekly transatlantic flights scheduled by Imperial Airways; suspended in September.
 15 August – first personnel of the Government Code and Cypher School move to Bletchley Park.
 19 August – Sir Malcolm Campbell sets the water speed record in Blue Bird K4 on Coniston Water.
 23 August–2 September – most paintings from the National Gallery in London are evacuated to Wales.
 24 August – as details of the previous day's Molotov–Ribbentrop Pact become public, Parliament is recalled several weeks early; the Emergency Powers (Defence) Act 1939 gives full authority to defence regulations, Army reservists are called up and Civil Defence workers placed on alert.
 25 August – 1939 Coventry bombing: An Irish Republican Army bomb explodes in Coventry, killing 5 and injuring 70. In London, police defuse two similar bombs and arrest four terrorists.
 30 August – Royal Navy proceeds to war stations.
 1 September
 "Operation Pied Piper": 4-day evacuation of children from London and other major U.K. cities begins.
 Blackout imposed across Britain.
 The Army is officially mobilised.
 The BBC Home Service begins broadcasting but BBC Television shuts down at 12:35 p.m. until 1946.
 The Administration of Justice (Emergency Provisions) Act reduces the size of juries from 12 to 7 in most cases and abolishes trial by jury in most civil cases.
 2 September – British Expeditionary Force headquarters formed.
 3 September – World War II
 Declaration of war by the United Kingdom on Nazi Germany following the German invasion of Poland on 1 September. Shortly after 11.00, Chamberlain announces this news on BBC Radio, speaking from 10 Downing Street. Twenty minutes later, air raid sirens sound in London (a false alarm). Chamberlain creates a small War Cabinet which includes Winston Churchill as First Lord of the Admiralty.
 General mobilisation of the armed services begins. The signal "Total Germany" is sent to ships.
 National Service (Armed Forces) Act passed by Parliament introduces National Service for all men aged 18 to 41.
Of the 1,418 aboard, 98 passengers and 19 crew are killed.
 In the week beginning today 400,000 pets are euthanised.
 4 September – first bombing of Wilhelmshaven in World War II by Royal Air Force Vickers Wellingtons.
 5 September – National Registration Act.
 9 September – British Expeditionary Force crosses to France.
 10 September – British submarine  torpedoes and sinks another British submarine, believing her to be a German U-boat, with the loss of 52 crew.
 16 September – the Duke of Windsor is appointed a major-general attached to the British Military Mission to France.
 18 September – American-born fascist politician William Joyce, at this time holding a British passport, begins broadcasting Nazi propaganda to Britain from Berlin, inheriting the nickname Lord Haw-Haw.
 19 September – popular radio comedy show It's That Man Again with Tommy Handley first broadcast on the BBC Home service, following trial broadcasts from 12 July. Known as "ITMA", it runs for ten years.
 24 September – petrol rationing introduced.
The aircraft carrier comes under air attack but survives.
 27 September – first war tax is revealed by the Cabinet, including a significant rise in income taxes.
 29 September – national register of citizens compiled to support the introduction of identity cards and rationing.
 30 September – Identity cards introduced.

October–December
 1 October – call-up proclamation: All men aged 20–21 must register with the military authorities.
 7 October – cruiser  departs Plymouth in convoy for Halifax, Nova Scotia, carrying £2M in gold bar to be used for purchase of military materiel in North America, a predecessor of Operation Fish.
 14 October – HMS Royal Oak sunk by a German U-boat in Scapa Flow, Orkney Islands with the loss of 833 crew.
 16 October – first enemy aircraft shot down by RAF Fighter Command, a Junkers Ju 88 brought down into the sea by Spitfires following an attack on Rosyth Naval Dockyard in Scotland.
 17 October – first bomb lands in the U.K., at Hoy in the Orkney Islands.
 21 October – registration of men aged 20 to 23 for National Service begins.
 30 October – British battleship  is unsuccessfully attacked by  under the command of captain Wilhelm Zahn off Orkney and is hit by three torpedoes, none of which explode; Winston Churchill (First Lord of the Admiralty), Admiral of the Fleet Dudley Pound (First Sea Lord) and Admiral Charles Forbes (Commander-in-Chief Home Fleet) are on board.
 4 November – Stewart Menzies is appointed head of the Secret Intelligence Service.
 8 November – Venlo Incident: two British agents of SIS are captured by the Germans.
 24 November – British Overseas Airways Corporation formed by merger of Imperial Airways and British Airways Ltd. effective from 1 April 1940.
 4 December
  strikes a mine (laid by ) off the coast of Scotland and is laid up for repairs until August 1940.
 German submarine U-36 is torpedoed and sunk by British submarine HMS Salmon off Stavanger, the first enemy submarine lost to a British one during the War.
 9 December – first soldier of the British Expeditionary Force killed: Corporal Thomas Priday triggers a French land mine.
 18 December – Battle of the Heligoland Bight: RAF Bomber Command, on a daylight mission to attack Kriegsmarine ships in the Heligoland Bight, is repulsed by Luftwaffe fighter aircraft.
 December – Pilgrim Trust establishes Committee for the Encouragement of Music and the Arts, predecessor of the Arts Council.

Publications
 H. E. Bates' short story collection My Uncle Silas.
 Joyce Carey's novel Mister Johnson.
 James Hadley Chase's thriller No Orchids for Miss Blandish.
 Agatha Christie's novels Murder Is Easy and And Then There Were None.
 Henry Green's novel Party Going.
 Aldous Huxley's novel After Many a Summer.
 Richard Llewellyn's novel How Green Was My Valley.
 Jan Struther's short story collection Mrs. Miniver.
 Poetry London: a Bi-Monthly of Modern Verse and Criticism, founded by Tambimuttu, first published (January/February).

Births
 8 January – Alan Wilson, mathematician and academic
 11 January – Phil Williams, Welsh politician (died 2003)
 15 January – Neil Cossons, industrial archaeologist and museum director
 20 January – Chandra Wickramasinghe, Ceylonese-born British astronomer and poet
 29 January – Tony Green, sportscaster
 5 February – Derek Wadsworth, jazz trombonist and composer (died 2008)
 10 February – Peter Purves, actor and television presenter
 18 February – Ray Lovejoy, film editor (died 2001)
 20 February – Frank Arundel, footballer (died 1994)
 3 March – Bill Frindall, cricket statistician (died 2009)
 4 March – Keith Skues, radio disc jockey
 9 March – John Howard Davies, child screen actor and television comedy director (died 2011)
 10 March – Len Ashurst, football player and manager (died 2021)
 17 March – Robin Knox-Johnston, yachtsman
 18 March – Ron Atkinson, footballer and football manager
 23 March
Robin Herd, engineer and businessman (died 2019)
Terry Paine, footballer
 24 March – Lynda Baron, actress (died 2022)
 5 April – David Winters, English-American actor, choreographer and director (died 2019)
 7 April – David Frost, television personality (died 2013)
 10 April – Penny Vincenzi, novelist (died 2018)
 12 April – Alan Ayckbourn, playwright
 13 April – Seamus Heaney, Irish poet, winner of the Nobel Prize in Literature (died 2013)
 15 April – Marty Wilde, actor and rock 'n' roll singer
 22 April 
 John Chilcot, civil servant (died 2021)
 Mark Jones, actor (died 2010)
 Ann Mitchell, English actress
 Alex Murphy, rugby league footballer and coach
 1 May – Lady Susan Hussey, courtier
 2 May – Peter Dean, actor
 4 May – Neil Fox, rugby league footballer
 5 May – Terry Walsh, actor and stuntman (died 2002)
 7 May – David Hatch, radio broadcaster and actor (died 2007)
 10 May – Bill Cash, English lawyer and politician
 25 May – Sir Ian McKellen, English actor
 27 May – Sarah Caudwell, barrister and author (died 2000)
 31 May
 Andrew Ray, actor (died 2003)
 Terry Waite, humanitarian, author and hostage
 5 June – Margaret Drabble, novelist and biographer
 8 June
 Francis Jacobs, English lawyer and judge
 Gordon Reid, Scottish actor (died 2003)
 11 June
 Rachael Heyhoe Flint, England cricketer (died 2017)
 Jackie Stewart, Scottish racing driver
 14 June – Peter Mayle, writer (died 2018)
 19 June – Michael Standing, actor
 26 June – Arthur Sutton, cricketer
 30 June – Tony Hatch, musical theatre and television composer
 2 July – Ferdinand Mount, journalist and novelist
 7 July – Stanley Henig, academic and politician
 10 July – John Dunlop, racehorse trainer (died 2018)
 11 July – John Walters, musician and radio presenter (died 2001)
 15 July – Reg Pridmore, motorcycle road racing national champion 
 16 July – Corin Redgrave, actor and political activist (died 2010)
 17 July – Spencer Davis, Welsh beat musician, multi-instrumentalist (The Spencer Davis Group) (died 2020 in the United States)
 18 July – Brian Auger, jazz and rock keyboardist
 22 July – Robert Phelps, modern pentathlete
 28 July – Richard Johns, air marshal
 4 August – Jack Cunningham, politician
 10 August
 Mick Ives, racing cyclist
 Kate O'Mara, English actress (died 2014)
 11 August – Naseem Khan, journalist (died 2017)
 15 August 
 Norma Waterson, folk musician (died 2022)
 Bill Wratten, air chief marshal
 16 August
 Sir Trevor McDonald, Trinidadian-born British journalist and broadcaster
 Carole Shelley, actress (died 2018)
 19 August
 Alan Baker, mathematician (died 2018)
 Ginger Baker, rock drummer (died 2019)
 25 August – John Bardon, actor (died 2014)
 30 August – John Peel, né Ravenscroft, disc jockey and radio presenter (died 2004)
 12 September – John Pearse, guitarist (died 2008)
 18 September – Maurice Colbourne, actor (died 1989)
 19 September 
 Bruce Bastin, musicologist and author
 Louise Botting, businesswoman and radio presenter
 22 September – Jean Golding, epidemiologist
 25 September – Leon Brittan, politician (died 2015)
 26 September - Ricky Tomlinson, actor
 27 September – Nicholas Haslam, interior designer
 29 September – Rhodri Morgan, Welsh politician (died 2017)
 1 October – Geoffrey Whitehead, actor
 6 October – Melvyn Bragg, media arts presenter, critic and novelist
 7 October – Harry Kroto, organic chemist, winner of the Nobel Prize in Chemistry (died 2016)
 19 October – David Clark, Baron Clark, Scottish politician
 22 October – George Cohen, English footballer (died 2022)
 23 October – Peter Armitage, English actor (died 2018)  
 24 October – John Adye, intelligence officer
 25 October – Dave Simmonds, road racer (died 1972)
 27 October – John Cleese, comic actor
 31 October – Tom O'Connor, entertainer and comedian (d. 2021)
 4 November – Michael Meacher, politician (died 2015).
 8 November – Elizabeth Dawn, actress (died 2017)
 11 November – Alf Adams, physicist
 12 November – Terry McDonald, footballer and coach
 16 November – Michael Billington, drama critic
 17 November – Auberon Waugh, journalist (died 2001) 
 18 November
Bill Giles, weather forecaster
Margaret Jay, Baroness Jay of Paddington, née Callaghan, politician
Ian McCulloch, actor
 13 December – Eric Flynn, singer-songwriter (died 2002)
 16 December – Gordon Miller, Olympic high jumper
 20 December – Tony Bentley, footballer
 26 December – Carol M. Black, physician and academic

Deaths
 9 January – Edwin Farley, mayor (born 1864)
 2 March – Howard Carter, archaeologist (born 1874)
 29 March – Ernest Hanbury Hankin, English bacteriologist and naturalist (born 1865)
 18 April – Ishbel Hamilton-Gordon, Marchioness of Aberdeen and Temair, patron and promoter of women's interests (born 1857)
 9 May – Sophie Williams, previously Mary, Lady Heath, aviator and athlete (born 1896)
 25 May –  Sir Frank Dyson, astronomer (born 1868)
 25 June – Richard Seaman, racing driver (car crash) (born 1913)
 26 June – Ford Madox Ford, novelist, poet, critic and editor (born 1873)
 20 July – Sir Dan Godfrey, conductor (born 1868)
 6 September – Arthur Rackham, illustrator (born 1867)
 13 September – Henry Halcro Johnston, botanist, physician, rugby union international and Deputy Lieutenant for Orkney (born 1856)
 18 September - Gwen John, artist (born 1876)
 19 September – Ethel M. Dell, romantic fiction writer (born 1881)
 26 September - Leif Jones, politician (born 1862)
 3 December – Princess Louise, Duchess of Argyll, daughter of Queen Victoria (born 1848)
 15 December – Len Cundell, English racehorse trainer (born 1879)
 19 December – Eric Fogg, composer and conductor (killed by train) (born 1903)

See also
 List of British films of 1939
 Military history of the United Kingdom during World War II

References

 
Years of the 20th century in the United Kingdom